This is a list of rural localities in Altai Krai. Altai Krai is a federal subject of Russia (a krai). It borders with, clockwise from the west, Kazakhstan (East Kazakhstan Region and Pavlodar Region), Novosibirsk and Kemerovo Oblasts, and the Altai Republic. The krai's administrative center is the city of Barnaul. As of the 2010 Census, the population of the krai was 2,419,755.

Aleysky District 
Rural localities in Aleysky District:

 Alexandrovsky
 Aleysky
 Beryozovsky
 Bezgolosovo
 Bolshepanyushevo
 Borikha
 Borovskoye
 Chernyshevsky
 Druzhba
 Dubrovsky
 Kabakovo
 Kashino
 Kirovskoye
 Kondratyevsky
 Krasnodubrovsky
 Krasny Yar
 Malakhovo
 Malinovka
 Mamontovsky
 Mokhovskoye
 Novokolpakovo
 Novonikolsky
 Oktyabrsky
 Oskolkovo
 Pervomaysky
 Plotava
 Priyatelsky
 Savinka
 Serebrennikovo
 Solnechny
 Sovkhozny
 Tolstaya Dubrova
 Troitsky
 Uryupino
 Urzhum
 Uspenovka
 Vavilon
 Vetyolki
 Yazevka-Sibirskaya
 Zavety Ilyicha
 Zelyonaya Polyana

Altaysky District 
Rural localities in Altaysky District:

 Altayskoye
 Aya
 Basargino
 Beloye
 Bolshaya Kyrkyla
 Bulatovo
 Bulukhta
 Cheremshanka
 Danilovka
 Katun
 Kazanka
 Komar
 Kuyacha
 Kuyagan
 Makaryevka
 Nikolskoye
 Nizhnekamenka
 Nizhnekayancha
 Proletarka
 Rossoshi
 Rudnik
 Sarasa
 Starobelokurikha
 Tourak
 Verkh-Ya

Barnaul 
Rural localities in Barnaul urban okrug:

 Belmesyovo
 Berezovka
 Borzovaya Zaimka
 Chernitsk
 Gonba
 Kazyonnaya Zaimka
 Konyukhi
 Lebyazhye
 Lesnoy
 Mokhnatushka
 Nauchny Gorodok
 Novomikhaylovka
 Polzunovo
 Prigorodny
 Vlasikha
 Vlasikha
 Yagodnoye
 Zemlyanukha

Bayevsky District 
Rural localities in Bayevsky District:

 Bayevo
 Chumanka
 Kapustinka
 Nizhnechumanka
 Nizhnepayva
 Paklino
 Pavlovka
 Plotava
 Pokrovka
 Proslaukha
 Rybnye Borki
 Safronovo
 Sitnikovo
 Verkh-Chumanka
 Verkh-Payva

Biysk 
Rural localities in Biysk urban okrug:

 Fominskoye
 Nagorny
 Odintsovka
 Zhavoronkovo

Biysky District 
Rural localities in Biysky District:

 Amursky
 Borovoy
 Chuysky
 Klyuchi
 Lesnoye
 Malougrenyovo
 Maloyeniseyskoye
 Novikovo
 Obraztsovka
 Pevomayskoye
 Predgorny
 Prigorodny
 Shebalino
 Srostki
 Svetloozyorskoye
 Ust-Katun
 Verkh-Bekhtemir
 Verkh-Katunskoye
 Yagodny
 Yasnaya Polyana
 Yeniseyskoye
 Zaozerny
 Zarya

Blagoveshchensky District 
Rural localities in Blagoveshchensky District:

 Alexandrovka
 Alexeyevka
 Baygamut
 Dmitriyevka
 Dolinka
 Glyaden
 Glyaden-2
 Glyaden-3
 Glyaden-4
 Kalinovka
 Khoroshavka
 Kurgan
 Lenki
 Melnikovka
 Mikhaylovka
 Nikolayevka
 Nizhny Kuchuk
 Novokulundinka
 Novotyumentsevo
 Orlean
 Pregradinka
 Shimolino
 Sukhoy Rakit
 Suvorovka
 Tatyanovka
 Telmansky
 Yagotino
 Yagotinskaya

Burlinsky District 
Rural localities in Burlinsky District:

 Bigeldy
 Burla
 Burlinka
 Chernavka
 Gusinaya Lyaga
 Kineral
 Kirillovka
 Lesnoye
 Mikhaylovka
 Mirny
 Novoalexeyevka
 Novoandreyevka
 Novopeschanoye
 Novoselskoye
 Orekhovo
 Partizanskoye
 Pervomayskoye
 Petrovka
 Prityka
 Staropeschanoye
 Tsvetopol
 Ustyanka
 Volchy Rakit

Bystroistoksky District 
Rural localities in Bystroistoksky District:

 Akutikha
 Bystry Istok
 Khleborobnoye
 Novopokrovka
 Novosmolenka
 Pervomaysky
 Priobskoye
 Smolensky
 Soldatovo
 Ust-Anuy
 Verkh-Anuyskoye
 Verkh-Ozyornoe

Charyshsky District 
Rural localities in Charyshsky District:

 Charyshskoye

Kalmansky District 
Rural localities in Kalmansky District:

 Alexandrovka
 Altay
 Buranovo
 Ivanovka
 Kalmanka
 Kubanka
 Novobarnaulka
 Novoromanovo
 Novy
 Panfilovo
 Shadrino
 Shilovo
 Troitsk
 Ust-Aleyka
 Zimari

Kamensky District 
Rural localities in Kamensky District:

 3 Internatsional
 Allak
 Dresvyanka
 Dukhovaya
 Filippovsky
 Gonokhovo
 Kalinovka
 Klyuchi
 Kornilovo
 Lugovoye
 Maletino
 Mikhaylovka
 Myski
 Novoyarki
 Obskoye
 Oktyabrsky
 Plotinnaya
 Plotnikovo
 Podvetrenno-Teleutskoye
 Poperechnoye
 Razdolny
 Rybnoye
 Samarsky
 Sokolovo
 Stolbovo
 Tambovsky
 Tolstovsky
 Verkh-Allak
 Vetrenno-Teleutskoye
 Zelyonaya Dubrava

Khabarsky District 
Rural localities in Khabarsky District:

 Alexeyevka
 Berezovka
 Bogatskoye
 Dobrovolshchina
 Kalinovka
 Khabary
 Khabary
 Korotoyak
 Malopavlovka
 Martovka
 Michurinskoye
 Moskovka
 Nechayevka
 Novofyodorovka
 Novoilyinka
 Novoplotava
 Novovasilyevka
 Pioner Truda
 Plyoso-Kurya
 Poperechnoye
 Rassvet
 Serp i Molot
 Smirnovsky
 Sverdlovskoye
 Topolnoye
 Tselinny
 Ust-Kurya
 Utyanka
 Vasilyevka
 Voskhod
 Yasnaya Polyana
 Zyatkova Rechka

Klyuchevsky District 
Rural localities in Klyuchevsky District:

 Istimis
 Kaip
 Klyuchi
 Krasny Yar
 Makarovka
 Markovka
 Novopoltava
 Novovoznesenka
 Petrovka
 Petukhi
 Platovka
 Pokrovka
 Severka
 Slava
 Tselinny
 Vasilchuki
 Zapadny Ugol
 Zelyonaya Polyana

Kosikhinsky District 
Rural localities in Kosikhinsky District:

 Kosikha
 Malakhovo
 Ovchinnikovo
 Polkovnikovo
 Verkh-Zhilino

Krasnogorsky District 
Rural localities in Krasnogorsky District:

 Berezovka
 Krasnogorskoye
 Lugovoye
 Souskanikha
 Ust-Kazha

Krasnoshchyokovsky District 
Rural localities in Krasnoshchyokovsky District:

 Berezovka
 Charyshsky
 Chineta
 Krasnoshchyokovo
 Malaya Suyetka
 Novoshipunovo

Krutikhinsky District 
Rural localities in Krutikhinsky District:

 Bolshoy Log
 Borovoye
 Buyan
 Dolganka
 Karasi
 Krasnoryazhsky
 Krutikha
 Malovolchanka
 Maslyakha
 Moskovsky
 Novouvalsky
 Podborny
 Pryganka
 Radostny
 Volchno-Burlinskoye
 Zakovryashino

Kulundinsky District 
Rural localities in Kulundinsky District:

 Ananyevka
 Belotserkovka
 Estlan
 Gorodetsky
 Kilty
 Kirey
 Konstantinovka
 Krasnaya Sloboda
 Krotovka
 Kulunda
 Kursk
 Mirabilit
 Mirny
 Myshkino
 Novopetrovka
 Novopokrovka
 Novoznamenka
 Oktyabrsky
 Orlovka
 Ozyornoye
 Popasnoye
 Semyonovka
 Sergeyevka
 Smirnenkoye
 Troitsk
 Vinogradovka
 Voskresenovka
 Vozdvizhenka
 Yekaterinovka
 Zheleznodorozhnaya Kazarma 24 km
 Zlatopol

Kuryinsky District 
Rural localities in Kuryinsky District:

 Bugryshikha
 Gornovka
 Ivanovka
 Kalmatsky
 Kamenka
 Kazantsevo
 Kolyvan
 Krasnoznamenka
 Krasnoznamensky
 Kurya
 Kuznetsovo
 Mikhaylovka
 Novofirsovo
 Novoznamenka
 Podkhoz
 Podpalattsy
 Podzaymishche
 Posyolok imeni 8 Marta
 Ruchyovo
 Rudovozovo
 Trusovo
 Ust-Talovka

Kytmanovsky District 
Rural localities in Kytmanovsky District:

 Dmitro-Titovo
 Kalinovsky
 Kytmanovo
 Novokytmanovo
 Novoozyornoye
 Otradnoye
 Poroshino
 Semyonovo-Krasilovo
 Staraya Taraba
 Uskovo
 Zarechnoye

Loktevsky District 
Rural localities in Loktevsky District:

 Alexandrovka
 Antoshikha
 Ermoshikha
 Georgiyevka
 Gilyovo
 Kirovsky
 Kucherovka
 Lokot
 Masalsky
 Mezhdurechye
 Mirny
 Nikolayevka
 Novenkoye
 Novomikhaylovka
 Pavlovka
 Pokrovka
 Removsky
 Samarka
 Sovetsky Put
 Stepnoy
 Uspenka
 Ustyanka
 Vtoraya Kamenka
 Zolotukha

Mamontovsky District 
Rural localities in Mamontovsky District:

 Kadnikovo
 Kostin Log
 Krestyanka
 Mamontovo
 Pervomaysky
 Poteryayevka
 Travnoye
 Yermachikha

Mikhaylovsky District 
Rural localities in Mikhaylovsky District:

 Aschegul
 Bastan
 Irkutsky
 Mikhaylovskoye
 Nazarovka
 Nevodnoye
 Nikolayevka
 Nikolayevka
 Poluyamki
 Rakity

Nemetsky National District 
Rural localities in Nemetsky National District:

 Alexandrovka
 Degtyarka
 Dvorskoye
 Galbshtadt
 Grishkovka
 Kamyshi
 Krasnoarmeysky
 Kusak
 Lesnoye
 Nikolayevka
 Orlovo
 Podsosnovo
 Polevoye
 Protasovo
 Redkaya Dubrava
 Shumanovka

Novichikhinsky District 
Rural localities in Novichikhinsky District:

 Melnikovo
 Novichikha
 Solonovka

Pankrushikhinsky District 
Rural localities in Pankrushikhinsky District:

 Beregovoye
 Berezovsky
 Lensky
 Lukovka
 Pankrushikha
 Petrovsky
 Romanovo
 Zarechny
 Zarya

Pavlovsky District 
Rural localities in Pavlovsky District:

 Arbuzovka
 Arbuzovka
 Borovikovo
 Buranovka
 Chernopyatovo
 Cheryomno-Podgornoye
 Cheryomnoye
 Kasmala
 Kolyvanskoye
 Komsomolsky
 Krasnaya Dubrava
 Krasny May
 Lebyazhye
 Novye Zori
 Pavlovsk
 Prutskoy
 Rogozikha
 Sarai
 Shakhi
 Sibirskiye Ogni
 Solonovka
 Stukovo
 Urozhayny
 Yelunino
 Zhukovka

Pervomaysky District 
Rural localities in Pervomaysky District:

 Akulovo
 Bayunovskiye Klyuchi
 Bazhevo
 Berezovka
 Beshentsevo
 Bobrovka
 Borovikha
 Firsovo
 Golubtsovo
 Golyshevo
 Kazachy
 Kislukha
 Kostyaki
 Lebyazhye
 Lesnaya Polyana
 Lesnoy
 Lesnoy
 Logovskoye
 Losikha
 Malaya Povalikha
 Malaya Rechka
 Nizhnyaya Petrovka
 Nogino
 Novoberezovka
 Novochesnokovka
 Novokopylovo
 Novokrayushkino
 Novopovalikha
 Novy Mir
 Novy
 Oktyabrskoye
 Pervomayskoye
 Porkovka
 Posyolok Ilyicha
 Povalikha
 Pravda
 Purysevo
 Rasskazikha
 Rogulichny
 Sannikovo
 Severny
 Sibirsky
 Solnechnoye
 Sorochy Log
 Sosnovka
 Starokraychikovo
 Stepnoy
 Talovka
 Volga
 Zheleznodorozhnaya Kazarma 193 km
 Zhilino
 Zhuravlikha
 Zudilovo

Petropavlovsky District 
Rural localities in Petropavlovsky District:

 Krasny Vostok
 Petropavlovskoye

Pospelikhinsky District 
Rural localities in Pospelikhinsky District:

 Berezovka
 Kalmytskiye Mysy
 Khodayevsky
 Krasnoyarskoye
 Nikolayevka
 Pospelikha
 Pospelikhinsky
 Posyolok imeni Mamontova
 Stepnobugrinsky

Rebrikhinsky District 
Rural localities in Rebrikhinsky District:

 Belovo
 Georgiyevka
 Klochki
 Lesnoy
 Panovo
 Ploskoseminsky
 Podstepnoye
 Rebrikha
 Shumilikha
 Tulay
 Ust-Mosikha
 Verkh-Borovlyanka
 Zelyonaya Roshcha
 Zimino

Rodinsky District 
Rural localities in Rodinsky District:

 Kayaushka
 Kochki
 Krasny Altay
 Mirny
 Novotroitsk
 Pokrovka
 Razdolnoye
 Razumovka
 Rodino
 Shatalovka
 Shubinka
 Stepnoy Kuchuk
 Stepnoye
 Tizek
 Tsentralnoye
 Voznesenka
 Vyacheslavka
 Yaroslavtsev Log
 Zelyonaya Dubrava
 Zelyony Lug

Romanovsky District 
Rural localities in Romanovsky District:

 Buranovka
 Dubrovino
 Gilyov-Log
 Granovka
 Guseletovo
 Kazantsevo
 Maysky
 Mormyshi
 Pamyat Kommunarov
 Pervomaysky
 Rassvet
 Romanovo
 Sidorovka
 Tambovsky
 Zakladnoye
 Zhuravli

Rubtsovsky District 
Rural localities in Rubtsovsky District:

 Aksenovka
 Berezovka
 Bezrukavka
 Bobkovo
 Bolshaya Shelkovka
 Bugry
 Chayka
 Cheburikha
 Dalny
 Kalinovka
 Katkovo
 Kolos
 Kolos
 Kuybyshevo
 Mamontovo
 Michurinsky
 Nazarovka
 Novoalexandrovka
 Novomatveyevka
 Novonikolayevka
 Novorossiysky
 Novosklyuikha
 Novovoznesenka
 Peschany
 Polovinkino
 Posyolok VI Kongressa Kominterna
 Posyolok imeni Kalinina
 Poteryayevka
 Priozerny
 Pushkino
 Rakity
 Romanovka
 Samarka
 Saratovka
 Shmidta
 Tishinka
 Traktorny
 Troinka
 Vesyoloyarsk
 Vishnevka
 Vtorye Korosteli
 Vympel
 Zakharovo
 Zarnitsa
 Zheleznodorozhnaya Kazarma 498 km
 Zheleznodorozhnaya Kazarma 512 km
 Zheleznodorozhnaya Kazarma 519 km
 Zheleznodorozhnaya Kazarma 538 km
 Zheleznodorozhnaya Kazarma 543 km
 Zelyonaya Dubrava
 Zerno

Shelabolikhinsky District 
Rural localities in Shelabolikhinsky District:

 Baturovo
 Bykovo
 Chaykino
 Ilyinka
 Inya
 Ivanovka
 Kiprino
 Krutishka
 Kuchuk
 Lugovoye
 Makarovo
 Malinovka
 Novoobintsevo
 Novosyolovka
 Omutskoye
 Podgorny
 Sakmarino
 Seleznyovo
 Shelabolikha
 Sibirka
 Verkh-Kuchuk

Shipunovsky District 
Rural localities in Shipunovsky District:

 Andreyevka
 Artamanovo
 Batalovo
 Beloglazovo
 Berezovka
 Bestuzhevo
 Bobrovka
 Bykovo
 Chupino
 Gorkovskoye
 Ilyinka
 Kalinovka
 Komarikha
 Korobeynikovo
 Kosobokovo
 Meteli
 Nechunayevo
 Porozhneye
 Rodino
 Samsonovo
 Shipunovo
 Tugozvonovo
 Urlapovo
 Ust-Porozikha
 Vorobyovo
 Yasnaya Polyana
 Yeltsovka
 Zerkaly

Sibirsky 
Rural localities in Sibirsky urban okrug:

 Sibirsky

Slavgorod 
Rural localities in Slavgorod urban okrug:

 Andreyevka
 Arkhangelskoye
 Aynak
 Ballastny Kuryer
 Bursol
 Danilovka
 Dobrovka
 Kalistratikha
 Kuatovka
 Maximovka
 Novovoznesenka
 Panovka
 Pavlovka
 Pokrovka
 Prigorodnoye
 Raygorod
 Selektsionnoye
 Semyonovka
 Slavgorodskoye
 Vesyoloye
 Vladimirovka
 Yekaterinovka
 Zelyonaya Roshcha
 Znamenka

Smolensky District 
Rural localities in Smolensky District:

 Anuyskoye
 Chernovaya
 Novotyryshkino
 Smolenskoye
 Solonovka
 Starotyryshkino
 Sychevka

Soloneshensky District 
Rural localities in Soloneshensky District:

 Berezovka
 Berezovo
 Chegon
 Dyomino
 Iskra
 Lyutayevo
 Sibiryachikha
 Soloneshnoye
 Telezhikha
 Topolnoye
 Tumanovo

Soltonsky District 
Rural localities in Soltonsky District:

 Neninka
 Solton

Sovetsky District 
Rural localities in Sovetsky District:

 Krasny Yar
 Nikolskoye
 Platovo
 Shulgin Log
 Sovetskoye
 Urozhaynoye

Suyetsky District 
Rural localities in Suyetsky District:

 Alexandrovka
 Beregovoy
 Boronsky
 Dobrovolsky
 Mikhaylovka
 Nikolayevka
 Nizhnyaya Suyetka
 Oktyabrsky
 Osinovsky
 Posyolok imeni Vladimira Ilyicha
 Sibirsky Gigant
 Tsibermanovo
 Ukrainsky
 Verkh-Suyetka

Tabunsky District 
Rural localities in Tabunsky District:

 Alexandrovka
 Altayskoye
 Bolsheromanovka
 Bolsheslavino
 Georgiyevka
 Granichnoye
 Kamyshenka
 Kanna
 Karpilovka
 Khorosheye
 Lebedino
 Nikolayevka
 Novokiyevka
 Novorossiyka
 Novosovkhozny
 Sambor
 Saratovka
 Serebropol
 Tabuny
 Udalnoye
 Uspenka
 Yambor
 Yelizavetgrad
 Yermakovka
 Zabavnoye

Talmensky District 
Rural localities in Talmensky District:

 Kazantsevo
 Litvinovka
 Novotroitsk

Togulsky District 
Rural localities in Togulsky District:

 Antipino
 Buranovo
 Kolonkovo
 Lnozavod
 Novoiushino
 Shumikha
 Stary Togul
 Titovo
 Togul
 Toptushka
 Uksunay
 Verkh-Koptelka

Topchikhinsky District 
Rural localities in Topchikhinsky District:

 Khabazino
 Kirovsky
 Komarikha
 Makaryevka
 Parfyonovo
 Peschanoye
 Topchikha
 Volodarka

Tretyakovsky District 
Rural localities in Tretyakovsky District:

 Chekanovo
 Ivanovka
 Korbolikha
 Krasnoye Razdolye
 Kryuchki
 Lopatinka
 Mikhaylovka
 Novoaleyskoye
 Novogalstovka
 Novokamyshenka
 Pervokamenka
 Ploskoye
 Semyonovka
 Shupunikha
 Staroaleyskoye
 Tretyakovo
 Verkh-Aleyka
 Yekaterininskoye

Troitsky District 
Rural localities in Troitsky District:

 Bolshaya Rechka
 Borovlyanka
 Mnogoozyorny
 Troitskoye
 Yeltsovka
 Zavodskoye

Tselinny District 
Rural localities in Tselinny District:

 Berezovka
 Maly Bashchelak
 Marushka
 Mayak
 Sentelek
 Tselinnoye
 Tulata
 Verkh-Shubinka

Tyumentsevsky District 
Rural localities in Tyumentsevsky District:

 Andronovo
 Berezovka
 Karpovsky
 Latkinsky
 Sosnovka
 Tyumentsevo
 Vylkovo
 Yudikha

Uglovsky District 
Rural localities in Uglovsky District:

 Alexeyevka
 Belenkoye
 Bor-Kosobulat
 Borisovka
 Chernokorovnikovo
 Gorkoye
 Kormikha
 Krugloye
 Kuybyshevo
 Laptev Log
 Lyapunovo
 Mirny
 Naumovka
 Novouglovsky
 Ozyorno-Kuznetsovo
 Ozyorno-Kuznetsovsky Leskhoz
 Pavlovka
 Pervye Korosteli
 Shadrukha
 Simonovo
 Topolinsky Leskhoz
 Topolnoye
 Uglovskoye
 Valovoy Kordon

Ust-Kalmansky District 
Rural localities in Ust-Kalmansky District:

 Buranovo
 Charyshskoye
 Druzhba
 Kabanovo
 Mikhaylovka
 Novoburanovo
 Novokalmanka
 Novotroyenka
 Novy Charysh
 Ogni
 Ponomaryovo
 Priozerny
 Slyudyanka
 Stepnoy
 Ust-Kalmanka
 Ust-Kamyshenka
 Ust-Yermilikha
 Vasilyevka
 Verkh-Slyudyanka
 Vostochny
 Yeltsovka
 Zapadny

Ust-Pristansky District 
Rural localities in Ust-Pristansky District:

 Belovo
 Klepikovo
 Korobeynikovo
 Romanovo
 Ust-Charyshskaya Pristan

Volchikhinsky District 
Rural localities in Volchikhinsky District:

 Beryozovsky
 Bor-Forpost
 Komintern
 Malyshev Log
 Novokormikha
 Plodosovkhoz
 Pravda
 Priborovoye
 Pyatkov Log
 Selivyorstovo
 Solonovka
 Ust-Kormikha
 Ust-Volchikha
 Volchikha
 Vostrovo

Yegoryevsky District 
Rural localities in Yegoryevsky District:

 Borisovka
 Dolino
 Ivanovka
 Kruglo-Sementsy
 Lebyazhye
 Malaya Shelkovka
 Mirny
 Novosovetsky
 Novoyegoryevskoye
 Peresheyechny
 Pervomayskoye
 Peschany Borok
 Petukhov Log
 Rechka-Kormikha
 Shubinka
 Sibir
 Srosty
 Titovka
 Zhernovtsy

Yeltsovsky District 
Rural localities in Yeltsovsky District:

 Aksenovo
 Bragino
 Cheremshanka
 Kedrovka
 Martynovo
 Novokamenka
 Poslednikovo
 Pushtulim
 Troitsk
 Verkh-Nenya
 Yeltsovka

Zalesovsky District 
Rural localities in Zalesovsky District:

 Borisovo
 Cheryomushkino
 Dumchevo
 Gunikha
 Kalinovka
 Kamyshenka
 Kordon
 Maly Kaltay
 Muravey
 Nikolsky
 Peshcherka
 Shatunovo
 Tundrikha
 Vidonovo
 Voskhod
 Zakharovo
 Zalesovo
 Zaplyvino

Zarinsky District 
Rural localities in Zarinsky District:

 Afonino
 Alambay
 Borovlyanka
 Golubtsovo
 Golukha
 Gonoshikha
 Goryushino
 Grishino
 Kazantsevo
 Khmelyovka
 Komarskoye
 Malinovka
 Mironovka
 Novodrachyonino
 Novokopylovo
 Novomonoshkino
 Novozyryanovo
 Omutnaya
 Shpagino
 Smaznevo
 Smirnovo
 Sosnovka
 Starodrachenino
 Staroglushinka
 Tyagun
 Verkh-Kamyshenka
 Voskresenka
 Yanovo
 Zhulanikha
 Zyryanovka

Zavyalovsky District 
Rural localities in Zavyalovsky District:

 Alexandrovka
 Chernavka
 Chistoozyorka
 Dobraya Volya
 Gilyovka
 Glubokoye
 Gonokhovo
 Kamyshenka
 Kharitonovo
 Krasnodubrovsky
 Malinovsky
 Novokulikovsky
 Ovechkino
 Ovechkino
 Soboli
 Svetloye
 Tumanovsky
 Zavyalovo

Zmeinogorsky District 
Rural localities in Zmeinogorsky District:

 Andreyevsky
 Baranovka
 Berezovka
 Bespalovsky
 Cherepanovsky
 Galtsovka
 Karamyshevo
 Krasnogvardeysky
 Kuzminka
 Lazurka
 Lokotok
 Nikolsk
 Novokuznetsovka
 Oktyabrsky
 Otrada
 Ryazanovka
 Savvushka
 Talovka
 Varshava
 Voronezh

Zonalny District 
Rural localities in Zonalny District:

 Bulanikha
 Komarovo
 Lugovskoye
 Mirny
 Novaya Chemrovka
 Novaya Mikhaylovka
 Oktyabrsky
 Pleshkovo
 Safonovka
 Savinovo
 Shubenka
 Sokolovo
 Urozhayny
 Voskhod
 Zonalnoye

See also 
 
 Lists of rural localities in Russia

References 

Altai Krai